State Route 309 (SR 309) is an east–west highway in central Ohio.  Its western terminus is at its interchange with U.S. Route 30 (US 30) near Delphos, and its eastern terminus is at its interchange with US 30 in Mansfield.  Its current route takes it through the cities of Lima, Kenton, Marion, Galion, and Ontario; as well as the villages of Elida and Caledonia.

Route description

Within the city of Lima, SR 309 is officially designated along SR 81 (North Street) from Jameson Avenue to Union Street, south along Union Street (concurrent with SR 65, and east along Elm Street (SR 117). The eastbound direction of SR 309 is signed south along Jameson Street to SR 117, then east along it while the westbound direction is signed along Central Avenue and Front Street.

In the city of Ontario, SR 309 becomes a four-lane divided highway shortly before a partial interchange with the western terminus of SR 430; all movements are provided by ramps, with the exception of westbound SR 309 to eastbound SR 430, which is accomplished by making a U-turn via a crossroad between the opposing lanes of SR 309. Next, there is a partial interchange providing access to and from Beer Road on the westbound side only of SR 309; westbound SR 309 narrows to a single lane through this junction and widens again beyond it. Following are intersections with Stumbo Road and with Lexington–Springmill Road. Next is a partial cloverleaf interchange at 4th Street. At the Ontario–Mansfield border, Home Road crosses the highway on an overpass. Just after comes the eastern terminus of SR 309 at a partial interchange with US 30; the only movements available are eastbound SR 309 to eastbound US 30, and westbound US 30 to westbound SR 309.

History

The current alignment of SR 309 follows the original alignment of US 30, established in 1925. In 1931, plans were made to reroute the section of US 30 between Delphos and Mansfield onto the original State Route 5, a more direct east–west route. To satisfy the concerns of business owners along the original route worried about the diversion of traffic and loss of business, divided routes were created with the original route designated as U.S. Route 30S and the new route as U.S. Route 30N.

The original western split of US 30S and US 30N was in downtown Delphos at the current intersection of Main Street and Fifth Street, while the eastern split was in eastern Mansfield at the current intersection of US 42 (Ashland Road) and Park Avenue East. By 1961, new highway construction resulted in both ends being moved. The realignment of US 30 to the northern parts of Mansfield and Ontario moved the eastern split to the current junction of SR 309 and US 30 in western Mansfield. The original eastern end of US 30S, along with the part of the original US 30 between Mansfield and Mifflin, was redesignated as State Route 430. In Delphos, the western 30N–30S split was moved to the intersection of Elida Road and Lincoln Highway, then east of the city limits, after a new section of Elida Road was built and US 30S routed onto it. The part of US 30S that ran along Elida Avenue and East Second Street was decommissioned.

In November 1973, US 30N became the mainline of US 30 and US 30S was redesignated as SR 309. The only significant change of the route since this certification is its western terminus. The original western terminus was where Elida Road (SR 309) met East Fifth Street and Lincoln Highway (US 30). As part of a new bypass completed in 1981 that routed US 30 around Delphos, SR 309's western terminus was moved to a new interchange with US 30 just east of the Delphos city limits. 

Prior the current route, the SR 309 designation was used on what is now State Route 541. It was replaced with the now defunct State Route 271 in 1935.

Harding Highway
The Lincoln Highway left the present State Route 309, a better-quality road at the time, in favor of the direct Delphos–Mansfield route now generally followed by US 30. Only two weeks after the official route was announced in September 1913, it had already been redefined to a straighter path between Lima and Galion; the rest of the straightening came later. The towns along the route got together and formed the Harding Highway, named after President Warren G. Harding, who had grown up in the area.

This Harding Highway continued east via the Lincoln Highway to Canton, turning southeast from there to Steubenville via State Route 43. To the west, it was marked along the Lincoln Highway to Van Wert, heading west along the present U.S. Route 224, roughly State Road 114, State Road 10, State Road 8, and State Road 2 through Indiana to the Illinois state line.

Future
There is a $4.1 million project in eastern Allen County to replace the current intersections at Thayer and Napoleon roads with roundabouts. The project began in April 2022 and is expected to be complete in November.

Major intersections

References

External links

IN SEARCH OF... THE SEPTEMBER 1913 LINCOLN HIGHWAY IN OHIO Galion to Lima

309
Lincoln Highway
Transportation in Allen County, Ohio
Transportation in Hardin County, Ohio
Transportation in Marion County, Ohio
Transportation in Morrow County, Ohio
Transportation in Crawford County, Ohio
Transportation in Richland County, Ohio
U.S. Route 30S